Thulasi is a 1987 Tamil-language romantic drama film directed by Ameerjan. The film stars Murali and Seetha. It was released on 27 November 1987.

Plot
Thirunavukarasu is considered as a God by his villagers. Nevertheless, his son Sammadham is an atheist and he doesn't believe in his father's power. Sammadham and Ponni, a low caste girl, fall in love with each other. Sammadham's best friend Siva, a low caste boy, passes the Master of Arts degree successfully. Thirunavukarasu's daughter Thulasi then develops a soft corner for Siva.

Thirunavukarasu cannot accept for his son Sammadham's marriage with Ponni due to caste difference. Sammadham then challenges him to marry her. Thirunavukarasu appoints henchmen to kill her and Ponni is found dead the next day in the water. In the meantime, Siva also falls in love with Thulasi. The rest of the story is what happens to Siva and Thulasi.

Cast

Murali as Sivalingam "Siva"
Seetha as Thulasi
Chandrasekhar as Sammadham
Major Sundarrajan as Thirunavukarasu 
Senthil 
Charle as Khan
Thara as Ponni
Mohanapriya as Sarasu
Vathiyar Raman
A. K. Veerasamy as Kaliyappan

Soundtrack

The film score and the soundtrack were composed by Sampath Selvam. The soundtrack, released in 1987, features 4 tracks with lyrics written by Vairamuthu.

Reception
The Indian Express gave a negative review calling it "thwarted love".

References

1987 films
Indian romantic drama films
1987 romantic drama films
1980s Tamil-language films
Films directed by Ameerjan